The Amazons: A Farcical Romance is an 1893 play by Arthur Wing Pinero.

The play subsequently opened the Royal Court Theatre on 7 March 1893 and ran for 111 performances until 8 July 1893. It subsequently opened at the Lyceum Theatre on 19 February 1894.

The plot involves three sisters (Noeline/Noel, Wilhelmina/Willis, and Thomasin/Tommie) raised by their aristocratic father as his male heirs. They have trouble adjusting to society.

The play was revived (again with Billie Burke) and opened at the Empire Theatre on 28 April 1913. The revival included the song "My Otaheitee lady" with music by Jerome Kern, using lyrics by the deceased Charles H. Taylor.

In 1917 it was adapted as a film of the same name.

Broadway cast

Lorena Atwood as "Sergeant" Shutter
Barrett Barker as Orts
Billie Burke as Lady Thomasin
Miriam Clements as Lady Noeline
Annie Esmond as Miriam
Arthur Fitzgerald as Youatt
Ferdinand Gottschalk as Galfred
Shelly Hull as Barrington
Dorothy Lane as Lady Wilhelmina
Thomas Reynolds as Fitton
Morton Selten as Rev. Minchin
Fritz Williams as Andre

References

External links

1893 plays
Plays by Arthur Wing Pinero
British plays adapted into films
West End plays